Siti Mastura Mohamad is a Malaysian politician. She has served as the Member of Parliament (MP) for Kepala Batas since 2022. At the grassroots level, she is the deputy head of the Penang State PAS Muslim Council.

Election results

References

Date of birth missing (living people)
Living people
Malaysian Muslims
Malaysian people of Malay descent
Malaysian Islamic Party politicians
Members of the Dewan Rakyat
Year of birth missing (living people)